Pohang Baseball Stadium is a baseball stadium in Pohang, South Korea. The stadium is currently being used as a second home of the KBO League team Samsung Lions.

Baseball venues in South Korea
Samsung Lions
Sports venues in North Gyeongsang Province
Sports venues completed in 2012